is a Japanese actor.

Career
Born in Kyoto Prefecture, Shiomi went to Doshisha University. He joined the theater troupe En in 1978 and soon also began appearing in film and television, mostly as a character actor. He won a Japan Movie Critics Award for best supporting actor for the film Ki no Umi (2004).

Selected filmography

Film
 The City That Never Sleeps: Shinjuku Shark (1993)
 Love Letter (1995)
 Swallowtail (1996)
 Eureka (2000)
 Calmi Cuori Appassionati (2001)
 Go (2001)
 When the Last Sword Is Drawn (2003), Kondō Isami
 Blood and Bones (2004)
 Ki no Umi (2004)
 Tokyo Tower: Mom and Me, and Sometimes Dad (2007)
 The Battery (2007)
 Like a Dragon (2007)
 Sukiyaki Western Django (2007)
 Crows Zero (2007)
 Tokyo Rendezvous (2008)
 Children of the Dark (2008)
 Asahiyama Zoo Story: Penguins in the Sky (2009)
 Villain (2010)
 A Song I Remember (2011)
 Hoshi Mamoru Inu (2011)
 Outrage Beyond (2012)
 A Chorus of Angels (2012)
 Girl in the Sunny Place (2013)
 Outrage Coda (2017)
 Show Me the Way to the Station (2019)
 First Love (2019)
 The Voice of Sin (2020)

Television
 Oretachi wa Tenshi da! (1979)
 Taiheiki (1991), Kō no Moroyasu
 Ruri no Shima (2005)
 Kitaro ga Mita Gyokusai - Mizuki Shigeru no Senso (2007)
 School (2011)
 Saiko no Jinsei (2012)
 Amachan (2013)
 Gunshi Kanbei (2014)
 Idaten (2019), Inukai Tsuyoshi

References

External links
  (in Japanese)
 

1948 births
Living people
Male actors from Kyoto Prefecture
Doshisha University alumni